Ryan Delaire (born January 17, 1992) is a former American football defensive end. He played college football at Towson. He signed with the Tampa Bay Buccaneers as an undrafted free agent in 2015.

Early years
Delaire attended Windsor High School, where he was a standout athlete for several Warriors teams. He won a total of five letters in football and basketball. Off of the field, Delaire was a success as well; he was a multi-time scholar athlete who earned high honors accolades. After graduating from high school in 2010, Delaire chose to attend UMass to play football.

College career
As a redshirt freshman in 2011, Delaire appeared in 10 out of a possible 11 games during the 2011 season. In those 10 games, he amassed 9 tackles, including 2 for losses, and 0.5 sacks.

Delaire appeared in eight games for UMass during his sophomore season in 2012. He recorded 19 tackles, including 5 for losses, 2.5 sacks, and a forced fumble.

Prior to the 2013 season, Delaire transferred to Towson University to play for Rob Ambrose's Tigers. His move proved to be a beneficial move as he had his most successful season as a college athlete, both in terms of statistics and accolades. In 2013, Delaire was a crucial part of the national runner-up Towson team. He made 68 tackles and had 17.5 tackles for loss, 11.5 sacks, 3 pass break ups, 2 forced fumbles, and 4 fumble recoveries. Delaire's efforts earned him a spot on the All-CAA first team and also earned him College Sports Madness third team All-American and Beyond Sports Network third team All-American honors.

Professional career

Tampa Bay Buccaneers
Delaire was signed as an undrafted rookie on May 5, 2015.

Washington Redskins
The Washington Redskins signed Delaire to their practice squad on September 7, 2015.

Carolina Panthers
On September 30, 2015, the Carolina Panthers signed Delaire off the Redskins' practice squad.
In his first career game against the Tampa Bay Buccaneers, he recorded five tackles and two sacks of Jameis Winston. In following game, during the Panthers 27-23 victory at the Seattle Seahawks, Delaire recorded one tackle and five quarterback pressures against Russell Wilson. During the Panthers week 11 victory over the Washington Redskins to move them to 10-0 for the first time in franchise history, Delaire recorded a half sack on quarterback Kirk Cousins.

On February 7, 2016, Delaire's Panthers played in Super Bowl 50. He was inactive for the game, which saw the Panthers fall to the Denver Broncos by a score of 24–10.

On September 27, 2016, Delaire was placed on injured reserve with a knee injury. He was activated off injured reserve on November 25, 2016. He was placed back on injured reserve on December 27, 2016.

On July 25, 2017, Delaire was waived by the Panthers with a failed physical designation.

Indianapolis Colts
On August 11, 2018, Delaire signed with the Indianapolis Colts. He was waived on September 2, 2018.

San Francisco 49ers
On September 26, 2018, Delaire was signed to the San Francisco 49ers' practice squad. He was promoted to the active roster on October 6, 2018. He was waived on October 15, 2018 and was re-signed to the practice squad. On December 29, 2018, Delaire was promoted to the active roster. He was waived on May 6, 2019.

References

External links
Towson Tigers bio
Washington Redskins bio
Tampa Bay Buccaneers bio

1992 births
Living people
American football defensive ends
Carolina Panthers players
Indianapolis Colts players
People from Bloomfield, Connecticut
Players of American football from Connecticut
San Francisco 49ers players
Sportspeople from Hartford County, Connecticut
Tampa Bay Buccaneers players
Towson Tigers football players
Washington Redskins players